Berendt is a surname. Notable people with the surname include: 

 Georg Karl Berendt (1790–1850), German physician and paleontologist
 Joachim-Ernst Berendt (1922–2000), German jazz journalist
 Johannes Berendt (born 1981), German syndicated columnist
 John Berendt (born 1939), American author
 Jorge Berendt (born 1964), Argentine golfer
 Nicolai Berendt (1826–1889), Danish pianist and composer
 Paul Berendt, chairman of the Washington State Democratic Party, 1995-2006

See also
 Behrendt

Surnames from given names